Michael Murphy (1806 – 14 August 1852) was a notable New Zealand clerk, police magistrate and sub-sheriff. He was born in Ireland in about 1806.

References

1852 deaths
1806 births
District Court of New Zealand judges
Irish emigrants to New Zealand (before 1923)
Colony of New Zealand judges
Sheriffs of New Zealand